Eternal youth is the concept of immortality free of aging.

It can also refer to:
 Eternal Youth (Future Bible Heroes album), 2002
 Eternal Youth (Rolo Tomassi album), 2011
 Eternal Youth, an 1886 novel by Leopold von Sacher-Masoch
 Eternal Youth, official name of the statue Golden Boy, atop the Manitoba Legislative Building
 Eternal Youth, a thoroughbred horse, winner of the 1968 Hill Stakes
 "No. 29 (Eternal Youth)", a song from the 1971 album Smash Your Head Against the Wall by John Entwistle
 "Eternal Youth", a 1990 episode of Peter Pan and the Pirates
 "Eternal Youth" (Batman: The Animated Series), a 1992 episode of Batman: the Animated Series

See also
 Indefinite lifespan
 Tír na nÓg, the Land of Eternal Youth in Irish mythology